Obafemi is a Nigerian Yoruba male given name.
People with the name 'Obafemi' are:
 Obafemi Martins, former Nigerian national team footballer.
 Michael Obafemi, Irish footballer who plays for English Premiership club, Southampton  
 Obafemi Awolowo- Nigerian nationalist and statesman who played key role in Nigeria's independence
 Afolabi Obafemi
- an English professional footballer of Nigerian descent.